William "Billy" Feetham (birth unknown – death unknown) was a professional rugby league footballer who played in the 1890s. He played at club level for Hull F.C. (Heritage №), and Hull Kingston Rovers (Heritage №).

On 6 November 1897, he played as a substitute for the Hull Kingston Rovers against St Helens, without Hull FC's permission, causing complaints that his appearance for Hull Kingston Rovers violated Northern Union rules.

References

External links 
 Statistics at hullfc.com
 Stats → Past Players → "F"
 Search for "Feetham" at rugbyleagueproject.org
 Search for "Bill Feetham" at britishnewspaperarchive.co.uk
 Search for "Billy Feetham" at britishnewspaperarchive.co.uk
 Search for "William Feetham" at britishnewspaperarchive.co.uk

English rugby league players
Hull F.C. players
Hull Kingston Rovers players
Place of birth missing
Year of birth missing
Place of death missing
Year of death missing